Chaudhry Afzal Haq (1891–8 January 1942) was born in a Muslim  family, a writer, humanitarian, leader and co-founder of Majlis-e-Ahrar-e-Islam, and a senior political figure in the history of Indian subcontinent. He worked to help the poor and unrepresented in the Punjab. He founded Ahrar with Syed Ata Ullah Shah Bukhari. He was elected three times for the Punjab Assembly. He was a Member of the Legislative Assembly of India.

He was known as Mufakkir-e-Ahrar "Thinker of the Ahrar Party". He wrote many books such as Zindagi, Mehbub-e-Khuda, Deen-e-Islam, Azadi-e-Hind, Mera Afsanah, Jawahraat, Mashooqa-e-Punjab, Shaoor, Dehati rooman, Pakistan and untouchability, Taareekh-e-Ahrar, Dunya may dozakh, Islam and Socialism, etc. He died on 8 January 1942, in Lahore.

References

1942 deaths
Indian political writers
1891 births
Punjabi people
People from Hoshiarpur district
Presidents of Majlis-e-Ahrar-ul-Islam